Guruia is a genus of harvestmen in the family Phalangiidae.

Species
 Guruia africana (Karsch, 1878)
 Guruia longipes Roewer, 1911
 Guruia quadrispina Roewer, 1911
 Guruia talboti Roewer, 1911
 Guruia ultima Caporiacco, 1949

References

Harvestmen
Harvestman genera